Hackers in Wonderland is a 2000 documentary film, produced and directed by Russell Barnes, about hackers in the United Kingdom. The documentary contains interviews with the hackers, revealing what drives them to hack, and their opinions about hacktivism.

External links
 Hackers in Wonderland on YouTube
 

British documentary films
Hacking (computer security)
Documentary films about the Internet
Internet-based activism
Hacker culture
Works about computer hacking
2000s English-language films
2000s British films